Polateli, formerly Güldüzü and historically Ispanak, is a town and the administrative seat of the Polateli District in the Kilis Province of Turkey. It is inhabited by Turkmens of the Çavuşlu tribe and had a population of 1,045 in 2022.

References

Populated places in Kilis Province
Polateli District